Isaac Brown may refer to:

 Isaac H. Brown (1812–1880), American sexton
 Issac Ryan Brown (born 2005), American actor
 Isaac Van Arsdale Brown (1784–1861), American educator and Presbyterian clergyman who founded the Lawrenceville School in New Jersey
 Isaac Brown (basketball) (born 1969), American basketball coach
 Isaac Brown (naval officer) (1817–1889), American naval officer in the US and Confederate navies 
 Ike Brown (1942–2001), American baseball player

See also
 Isaac Brown House, a single-family home in Kalamazoo, Michigan